204 Mission, also known as Tulip Force, was a British military mission to China organized in 1940-1941 that went into action soon after Pearl Harbor. It was an attempt to provide military assistance to the Chinese Nationalist Army in order to sustain Chinese resistance to the Japanese occupation of China during the Second Sino-Japanese War. The first phase achieved very little but a second more successful phase was conducted before withdrawal.

Background
In November 1940, the British War office transferred Brigadier General Lancelot. E. Denny from India to the Chinese wartime capital Chungking, to serve as military attaché to China. In January 1941 Dennys reached Chungking and began "unobstrusive" discussions about mutual assistance. With the help of RAF Major James Warburton, Denny fostered relations between the British and the Chinese: airpower as well as guerrilla warfare was to be a major element of Anglo-Chinese military cooperation. At the end of February Denny recommended that a small military mission be set up Burma which would eventually move into neighboring Yunnan when war broke out between Japan and the British Empire. He forged a Sino-British agreement whereby British troops would assist the Chinese "Surprise Troops" units of guerrillas already operating in China, and China assist Britain in Burma.

Operations

Training in Burma
204 Mission was initiated with a small group of Australian soldiers from the 8th Division being posted to Burma. At the Bush Warfare School in Burma, run by Captain Mike Calvert, the men were trained in demolition, ambush and engineering reconnaissance during October and November 1941, and were provided with equipment and supplies. In addition to the Australian two officers and 43 men, Tulip Force also consisted of a number of British troops. In total, Mission 204 was composed of six commando contingents, three of which were deployed to China. (Of the other three, one was disbanded because of ill discipline, and the other two were involved in other missions against the Japanese.) The aim of the Mission was to infiltrate into China, and train Chinese guerrillas to fight the Japanese.

First phase
The men departed in February 1942, the first Phase consisting of three Contingents, two British and one Australian, each of 50 army commandos. From there they travelled another  by train into China, before traversing the mountainous border region to join Lieutenant-Colonel Chen Ling Sun's Chinese 5th Battalion. They brought with them large amounts of equipment, including explosives.

The Australian Minister in Chungking, Sir Frederic Eggleston, visited the men in their camp at Kiyang at the end of May, later recommending that the Australian troops remain at their base.

The Australians lived in the mountains with the Chinese Surprise Troops (so called because of their ability to surprise the enemy. The Nationalists did not like the term Guerilla because it was associated with communists). However, due to the nature of combat, the surprise was not a positive one (like the giving of a gift), it was normally a surprise that involved an assault or military action There were communications issues between the British and Australian troops, and the Chinese. Mission 204 had no food, as they had understood that the Chinese would provide it. The Chinese themselves had no food, but foraged for it and took what they wanted from the peasants, expecting that naturally the British would do the same. The British troops trained the Chinese Surprise troops in using demolitions, but apart from that were not used. They were not permitted by the Chinese to be involved in attacks on the Japanese.

The first phase of Mission 204 stayed until September 1942, when it was decided to remove these by now disillusioned and sick Australian and British troops. Despite the preparations and training, the Australians did not participate in any of the Chinese guerrilla activities. Additionally, they suffered from dysentery, malaria and typhus. The soldiers had no confidence in the Chinese commander under whom they were to serve, and it was perceived that they were not being used to any benefit by the Chinese military.

Second Phase: February 1943

The Second phase was more successful, with British medical and demolition experts assigned to the Surprise troops. This phase   ran from February 1943 to February 1945, and operated under standard British Military command, as opposed to the first phase which operated under the SOE. Learning lessons from the unsuccessful first phase, the second phase worked quite well, with valid assistance to the Chinese guerrilla actions. However, with the major Japanese Operation Ichi-Go underway, the Mission 204 soldiers were pulled out of China, being flown out of the area by the USAAF whose bases at Guilin and Luizhou were the targets of the Japanese.

From the Chinese perspective, the leader of the Chinese Surprise troops, General Li Mo'an, was very critical of the British effort.  In 1990, he said that the Commandos were in fact largely not soldiers, but mostly businessmen, priests and missionaries. He also stated that they forced their way into the locals' houses, harassed the local women, and were rowdy and disorderly. They also stole all the locals' possessions, were generally out of control, and treated all the Chinese as peasants, even those who were not. There is a view that he was directed to state this by the Chinese Communist party.

Out of the 180 soldiers involved in the operations, only three did not return home: two British and  one Australian who died in the operation.

References

Sources

Further reading 
 Whitehead, John and Bennett, George Escape to Fight on: With 204 Military Mission in China
 Bill Noonan, Lost Legion - Mission 204 and the Reluctant Dragon

World War II operations and battles of the Southeast Asia Theatre
Military units and formations established in 1941
Military units and formations disestablished in 1943
Military units and formations of Australia in World War II